The Samsung Galaxy S5 Mini is an Android smartphone developed by Samsung Electronics. It was announced in May 2014 and released on July 1, 2014. The S5 Mini is a mid-range model of its flagship Galaxy S5 smartphone and a successor to the Galaxy S4 Mini. It competes with the HTC One Mini 2 and the Sony Xperia Z1 Compact. It has a similar design and software features to its high-end counterpart, the Galaxy S5.

Specifications
The S5 Mini uses an almost identical variant of the S5's polycarbonate perforated faux-leather hardware design. Internally, it features a quad-core 1.4 GHz Exynos 3 Quad 3470 (for the SM-G800F, SM-G800M and SM-G800Y) or an equally-clocked Qualcomm Snapdragon 400 MSM8228 (for SM-G800A, SM-G800H and SM-G800R4) processor with 1.5 GB of RAM (of which approximately 277 MB is reserved for the system), 16 GB of expandable storage, and a 4.5 inch (1280x720 pixel) HD Super AMOLED screen with a pixel density of 326 PPI. The S5 Mini also includes a 2.1-megapixel front-facing camera, and an 8-megapixel rear-facing camera with 1080p video recording at 30 frames per second.

The device is claimed to be water resistant despite the exposed USB charging port, while the USB charging port of the Galaxy S5 requires to be covered by a flap to ensure water protection.

Below the screen are three buttons. The physical "Home" button in the centre contains a swipe-based fingerprint reader. The "Recent apps" (or Recent Tasks) and "Back" buttons are capacitive. Like the Galaxy S5, the Galaxy S5 mini no longer has a "Menu" key like its predecessors. It has been replaced with the Recent tasks key.

The Galaxy S5 Mini comes with Android 4.4.2 KitKat and Samsung's TouchWiz software which includes almost all of the features of the S5.

The S5 Mini contains a 2100 mAh, NFC-enabled battery. Its software, like the S5, also contains an "Ultra Power Saving" mode to further extend battery life; when enabled, all non-essential processes are disabled, and the screen switches to only rendering in white on black.  Additional power efficiency features include R2 Semiconductor's envelope tracking to improve power amplifier efficiency thereby decreasing heat and increasing battery life.

See also 
 Comparison of Samsung Galaxy S smartphones
 Samsung Galaxy S series

References

External links
 

Android (operating system) devices
Samsung mobile phones
Samsung Galaxy
Mobile phones introduced in 2014
Mobile phones with user-replaceable battery
Discontinued smartphones
Mobile phones with infrared transmitter